This is a list of episodes for the Dragnet television series that began in 1989, also known as The New Dragnet.

Series overview

Episodes

Season 1 (1989–90)

Season 2 (1990)

References
 
 

1989
Lists of American crime television series episodes